Hiern is a British surname. Notable people with the surname include:

Barry Hiern (born 1951), Australian cricketer
Ross Hiern (1922–1999), Australian cricketer
William Philip Hiern (1839–1925), British mathematician and botanist

See also
Hern

English-language surnames